Eastern Intercollegiate League may refer to:

 Predecessor leagues of the Ivy League
 Eastern Intercollegiate Basketball League, 1901–55
 Eastern Intercollegiate Baseball League, 1930–92
 Eastern Intercollegiate Conference, 1932–39
 Eastern Intercollegiate Athletic Conference
 Eastern Intercollegiate Football Association
 Eastern Intercollegiate Gymnastics League
 Eastern Intercollegiate Ski Association
 Eastern Intercollegiate Volleyball Association
 Eastern Intercollegiate Wrestling Association

See also 
 Eastern College Athletic Conference
 List of college athletic conferences in the United States